Denise M. Boyer-Merdich (born June 8, 1962) is an American former soccer player who played as a right winger, making seven appearances for the United States women's national team.

Career
Boyer-Merdich made her international debut for the United States in the team's inaugural match on August 18, 1985, in a friendly match against Italy. In total, she made seven appearances for the U.S. and scored one goal, earning her final cap on July 11, 1987, in a friendly match against Norway.

Career statistics

International

International goals

References

1962 births
Living people
Sportspeople from San Diego County, California
Soccer players from California
Soccer players from Washington (state)
American women's soccer players
United States women's international soccer players
Women's association football wingers
University of Puget Sound alumni
21st-century American women